Faedis is a comune (municipality) in the Province of Udine in the Italian region Friuli-Venezia Giulia, located about  northwest of Trieste and about  northeast of Udine, on the border with Slovenia.

Faedis borders the following municipalities: Attimis, Kobarid (Slovenia), Moimacco, Povoletto, Pulfero, Remanzacco, Taipana, Torreano.

Twin towns
Faedis is twinned with:

  Castellterçol, Spain, since 1991

References

External links
 Official website

Cities and towns in Friuli-Venezia Giulia